Kirka is a rural locality (a selo) and the administrative centre of Kirkinsky Selsoviet, Magaramkentsky District, Republic of Dagestan, Russia. The population was 1,254 as of 2010. There are 20 streets.

Geography 
Kirka is located 18 km southwest of Magaramkent (the district's administrative centre) by road. Khorel and Mugergan are the nearest rural localities.

Nationalities 
Lezgins live there.

References 

Rural localities in Magaramkentsky District